Artiestenhof is a hofje in the Trompstraat in the Dutch city of The Hague.

It is a side street by the Piet Hein. Around 1850,  the older part of the Trompstraat had five courtyards and many businesses. The street was christened in 1872 by Sophie of the Netherlands, who was the owner of the land. The Trompstraat was extended around 1875 with higher-end properties.

The painters hofjes in the older part of the street and over the years was the residence of numerous notable artists, include Henk Bremmer who lived there from 1902 until his death in 1956. In the middle of the courtyard is a large communal garden, which before World War II was divided so that all houses had their own piece of garden.

Residents 
Artistic residents in the past were:
 Lucas Bauer (1896–1959), painter
 Theo Bitter (1916–1994), painter
 Nico of Bohemia (1916–1990), painter and restorer
 Henk Bremmer (1871–1956), the "Art Pope '
 Guido van Deth,puppeteer
 January Nobbe (1914–1981),  puppeteer, ventriloquist and juggler.
 Ton van Otterloo (1910–1979), actor
 Peter Siers (Peter Ferdinand Oudkerk Pool) 1910–2001), comedian

Buildings and structures in The Hague